Libanus Chapel may refer to:

Libanus Chapel, Aberaman, Rhondda Cynon Taf, Wales
Libanus Chapel, Swansea, Wales
Tabernacle Chapel, Morriston, Swansea, Wales

See also
Libanus (disambiguation)